Archobarzane, grandson of Syphax, was the last king of the Masaesylians, after his father Vermina.

Contrary to his father, who sought peace with the Romans after the Second Punic War, Archobarzane seems to have been in favor of Carthage. His kingdom was therefore annexed by Massinissa around 157 BC, with the blessing of Rome.

References

External links
 Recueil des notices et mémoires de la Société archélologique de la Province de Constantine, vol. 7. Published in 1863.

200s BC deaths
2nd-century BC Berber people
Kings of Numidia
Second Punic War commanders
Year of birth missing